Oracle HTTP Server (OHS) is a web server based on the Apache HTTP Server, created by the Oracle Technology Network. The web server is based on Apache version 2.2.13. OHS, like Apache 2.2, includes support for IPv6.

It is a Web Tier component of the Oracle Fusion Middleware.

Features: 
 SSL/TLS security
 Virtual host
 Proxy Server
 Mod_PLSQL interface for executing PL/SQL stored procedures in an Oracle database

See also
 Oracle Technology Network
 Oracle Fusion Middleware
 Oracle iPlanet Web Server
 Oracle WebLogic Server
 Oracle Application Server
 GlassFish
 Comparison of web server software
 Comparison of application servers

References

External links
 Oracle Site

Web server software
Oracle software